The 1986 Sun Bowl featured the Alabama Crimson Tide of the Southeastern Conference (SEC) and the Washington Huskies of the Pacific-10 Conference. In Ray Perkins's final game as Alabama head coach, the Crimson Tide defeated the Huskies 

This was the first edition of the Sun Bowl that carried corporate sponsorship, as John Hancock Financial entered a three-year, $1.5 million partnership. The Fiesta Bowl had done so approximately a year earlier, entering a sponsorship agreement in September 1985 and playing its January 1986 edition as the Sunkist Fiesta Bowl.

Teams

Alabama

Alabama opened the season with seven wins, then lost three of its final five regular season games to finish with a 9–3 record. Following their loss to Auburn in the Iron Bowl, university officials announced they accepted an invitation to play in the Sun Bowl. The appearance marked the second for Alabama in the Sun Bowl, and their 39th bowl game.
The Tide was favored by

Washington

Washington finished the regular season with an 8–2–1 record. Tied for second place in the Pac-10, the Huskies lost to USC and Arizona State, and tied UCLA. Following their victory over Washington State in the Apple Cup, university officials announced they accepted an invitation to play in the Sun Bowl. It was Washington's second appearance in the Sun Bowl, and their 17th bowl game.

Game summary
After a scoreless first quarter, Alabama scored first on a 64-yard Bobby Humphrey touchdown run. Washington responded with a pair of Jeff Jaeger field goals to cut the lead to  

Mike Shula was responsible for both touchdowns with the first coming on a 32-yard pass to Greg Richardson and the second on a 17-yard pass to Bobby Humphrey. Humphrey then scored the final points of the game midway through the fourth on a three-yard run to cap a 16-play,

Aftermath
According to then Washington defensive coordinator Jim Lambright, this game highlighted the need for Washington to begin to recruit speed more seriously. Lambright would later be quoted as saying, "[i]t was after our bowl game against Alabama in the Sun Bowl [that we started recruiting speed specifically] .... [W]hen we broke down the film, there was no way that our personnel matched their personnel as far as speed. So we went out after that to specifically recruit faster people .... We weren't selective enough up to that point with speed."

Five years later in the 1991 season, Washington went undefeated and won the national championship.

References

Sun Bowl
Sun Bowl
Alabama Crimson Tide football bowl games
Washington Huskies football bowl games
December 1986 sports events in the United States
1986 in sports in Texas